Shëngjin Island  (in Albanian Ishulli Shëngjin) is a settlement in the Lezhë County, northwestern Albania. It is part of the former municipality Shëngjin. At the 2015 local government reform it became part of the municipality Lezhë.

References

Populated places in Lezhë
Villages in Lezhë County
Shëngjin